Qaflankuh-e Gharbi Rural District is in the Central District of Mianeh County, East Azerbaijan province, Iran. At the National Census of 2006, its population was 12,166 in 2,990 households. There were 11,920 inhabitants in 3,557 households at the following census of 2011. At the most recent census of 2016, the population of the rural district was 7,372 in 2,308 households. The largest of its 20 villages was Eslamabad, with 2,281 people.

References 

Meyaneh County

Rural Districts of East Azerbaijan Province

Populated places in East Azerbaijan Province

Populated places in Meyaneh County